Dominique Damiani (12 July 1953 – 17 September 2019) was a French cyclist. She competed in the women's road race event at the 1984 Summer Olympics.

References

External links
 

1953 births
2019 deaths
French female cyclists
Olympic cyclists of France
Cyclists at the 1984 Summer Olympics
People from Bourgoin-Jallieu
Sportspeople from Isère
Cyclists from Auvergne-Rhône-Alpes
21st-century French people
20th-century French people